Mollemann is a surname. Notable people with the surname include:

Jürgen Möllemann (1945–2003), German politician
, 16th-century German printer

See also
 (1935–2005), Dutch politician

German-language surnames